Naldöken is a station on İZBAN's Northern Line. Naldöken is the first station east of the Karşıyaka tunnel.

Railway stations in İzmir Province
Railway stations opened in 2001
2001 establishments in Turkey
Bornova District